Youssif Hassan Youssif Al-Zoghbi (born  15 July 1999) is an Egyptian footballer who plays for Al Nasr.

He is a graduate of the Zamalek youth academy. Hassan's debut with first team was in the 2012–2013 season.

References

1992 births
Living people
Egyptian footballers
Egyptian expatriate footballers
Zamalek SC players
Misr Lel Makkasa SC players
Ghazl El Mahalla SC players
FC Masr players
Al-Watani Club players
Egyptian Premier League players
Saudi Second Division players
Egyptian expatriate sportspeople in Saudi Arabia
Expatriate footballers in Saudi Arabia
Association football forwards
People from Monufia Governorate